Subha Nagalakshmi Munchetty-Chendriah (born 25 February 1975), also known as Naga Munchetty, is a British television presenter, newsreader and journalist. She regularly presents BBC Breakfast. She is also a former presenter of BBC World News and BBC Two's weekday financial affairs programme Working Lunch.

Early life and career
Munchetty was born and grew up in Streatham, South London. Her mother is from Tamil Nadu, India and her father is from Mauritius; they each moved to Wales, in the early 1970s, to study, her mother for dentistry and her father training to be a nurse. They married in London, without telling their parents until they had done it. She has a younger sister, Mimi. Her early education was at Graveney School in Tooting. She studied English Literature and Language at the University of Leeds, graduating in 1997. Her first job was as a journalist on the City Pages of the London Evening Standard. She also worked on the Business Section of The Observer.

Career 
Munchetty's television career began as a reporter for Reuters Financial Television, after which she worked as a senior producer for CNBC Europe, a business producer and reporter for Channel 4 News and a presenter on Bloomberg Television.

Munchetty joined Working Lunch after the show was revamped in October 2008 and stayed with the programme until it was cancelled in July 2010. Munchetty has hosted Radio 4's Money Box. She also reports from the City for BBC News, gauging the reaction to breaking financial stories such as the Budget, and the Pre-Budget Report.

Since August 2010, Munchetty has presented early morning bulletins (UKT) on the BBC News Channel and BBC World News. She is a regular presenter on BBC One's Breakfast. 
From January 2021 Munchetty became the presenter on the 10am to 1pm Radio 5 programme on Mondays to Wednesdays replacing Emma Barnett. who moved to Radio 4's Woman's Hour.
Munchetty co-hosted The Spending Review – The South Today Debate on BBC One with Sally Taylor in September 2010.

Munchetty also presented Paranormal Investigation: Live on Living on 30–31 October 2010 to celebrate Hallowe'en. Munchetty narrated the BBC documentary Fear and Faith in Paris looking at anti-Semitic attacks in Paris and their impact on the Jewish community of France. She won Celebrity Mastermind, which was broadcast on 2 January 2013. In June 2016, she replaced Sian Williams as presenter of Sunday Morning Live on BBC One. In 2017, she was replaced by Emma Barnett and Sean Fletcher. On 26 August 2016, Munchetty presented an episode of Newsnight on BBC Two.

She was a contestant on the fourteenth series of Strictly Come Dancing, having been paired with Pasha Kovalev, and being voted out in week four (Sunday 16 October 2016). She co-presented Britain's Classroom Heroes with Sean Fletcher in October 2017.

In 2017, Munchetty joined the cast of CBBC sketch show Class Dismissed playing a fictionalised version of herself as a Media Studies teacher who acts like a newsreader.

On Boxing Day 2022 Munchetty appeared on the BBC quiz show The Weakest Link.

Trump comments 
In September 2019, Munchetty was ruled to have breached the BBC's guidelines by criticising US President Donald Trump for perceived racism. That July, while presenting BBC Breakfast with Dan Walker, Munchetty took issue with Trump's comments telling his opponents to "go back" to the "places from which they came". Munchetty said: "Every time I have been told, as a woman of colour, to go back to where I came from, that was embedded in racism. Now I'm not accusing anyone of anything here, but you know what certain phrases mean."

The BBC was criticised for its decision to uphold complaints over Munchetty's comments. Several public figures, including Lenny Henry and Adrian Lester, signed an open letter asking the corporation to reconsider its ruling against her.

On 30 September 2019 it was reported in The Guardian that the complaint was also made against her co-host Dan Walker but his comments were not the focus of the BBC's executive complaints unit (ECU) investigation. Later that day the Director-General of the BBC Tony Hall overturned the decision after looking into it personally.

Personal life 

Naga married ITV broadcast consultant James Haggar in 2004. She lives in Rickmansworth, Hertfordshire. 

Munchetty plays jazz trumpet and classical piano. She plays golf, with a handicap of nine in 2015. In October 2012, she won the Hertfordshire de Paula Cup at Bishop's Stortford Golf Club. She is now a committee member of Moor Park Golf Club, where she presents the annual Charity Golf Day in June.

She is also a trustee of local theatre, Watersmeet, and a governor at St Joan of Arc School.

References

External links 
 Naga Munchetty BBC News
 Naga Munchetty (BBC Radio 5 Live)
 
 Twitter
 NAGA MUNCHETTY LIMITED on Companies House

1975 births
Living people
People from Streatham
Alumni of the University of Leeds
BBC newsreaders and journalists
BBC Radio 5 Live presenters
British journalists
British people of Mauritian descent
British people of Indian Tamil descent
British reporters and correspondents
British television presenters
The Observer people
Channel 4 presenters
CNBC people